The 2010–11 Welsh League Cup is the 19th season of the Welsh League Cup, which was established in 1992. The cup culminated with the Final between Llanelli A.F.C. and The New Saints F.C. which The New Saints won 4–3 after extra time.

First round

First leg

Source: welsh-premier.com

Second leg

Source: welsh-premier.com

Second round

First leg

Source: welsh-premier.com

Second leg

Source: welsh-premier.com

Semi finals

First leg

Second leg

The New Saints won 12–1 on aggregate.

Llanelli won 4–1 in aggregate.

Final

External links
Official League Cup Website
 Welsh-Premier.com Loosemores League Cup
Loosemores Solicitors Official Website
Results

Welsh League Cup seasons
2010–11 in Welsh football cups
Wales